The International Chopin Festival is an annual classical music festival held in August in Duszniki-Zdrój in Kłodzko Valley, Poland. It is the oldest and principal Chopin Festival, to be distinguished from several other Chopin festivals including the International Music Festival held in Warsaw in September.

Other Chopin festivals
 Antonin, Ostrów Wielkopolski County - "Chopin in fall colors" founded 1982
 Valldemossa - Associacio Festivals Chopin de Valldemossa
 Nohant - Les Rencontres Internationales Frédéric Chopin, extension of the festival of George Sand
 Paris - Chopin concert series
 Mariánské Lázně
 Gaming, Austria
 Vienna
 Warsaw - Chopin and his Europe
 El Paso - El Paso Chopin Piano Festival
Belgrade Chopin Fest - Belgrade, Serbia

References

Music festivals in Poland
Classical music festivals in Poland
Annual events in Poland
Summer events in Poland
Frédéric Chopin